Teemu (Somnium) Raimoranta (19 May 1977 – 16 March 2003) was a Finnish metal musician. He was the founding guitarist of Finnish folk metal band Finntroll along with vocalist Jan "Katla" Jämsen. He was active in Finntroll as a guitarist until his death in 2003. He also played in Thy Serpent, Barathrum, and Impaled Nazarene.

Raimoranta died on 16 March 2003 after falling from the Kaisaniemi bridge in Helsinki while intoxicated.  His death occurred shortly after his involvement in Finntroll's completion of Visor Om Slutet, which was dedicated to his memory.

Discography

Thy Serpent
 Into Everlasting Fire Demo (1995)

Barathrum
 Saatana (1999)
 Okkult (2000)

Finntroll
 Rivfader Demo (1998)
 Midnattens Widunder (1999)
 Jaktens Tid (2001)
 Visor Om Slutet (2003)

Impaled Nazarene
 Absence of War Does Not Mean Peace (2001)

References

1977 births
2003 deaths
Finnish heavy metal guitarists
Finnish heavy metal musicians
Musicians from Helsinki
Black metal guitarists
20th-century guitarists
Accidental deaths in Finland
Accidental deaths from falls
Alcohol-related deaths in Finland